The C.F. Zaragoza, commonly known as Zaragoza, is a Mexican football club based in Puebla, Puebla, Veracruz Mexico, and currently plays in the Liga TDP.

History

Clubs first Season and COVID–19
The club was founded in 2019 in the Liga TDP which is Mexico's fourth tier division. The club was placed in group 2 made up of teams from the south east region of Mexico. Fernando Martínez Aldana was named as the club's first manager, who went on to lose its first game 5–0 to Club Deportivo Poza Rica. Due to the COVID-19 pandemic, the league suspended and eventually cancelled the 2019-2020 tournament.

Liga de Balompié Mexicano 
In late 2020, the club was rumored to join the newly created Liga de Balompié Mexicano as one of its founding members. On June of that same year, the club had announced a merger with the intention to create a football team in the state of Tabasco. This merger eventually fell through having that local government brought in an affiliated team from Liga MX top team Club Universidad Nacional. Due to the failed merger, the club returned to an individual team bid, this time having a verbal agreement with the local government of Teziutlán in the state of Puebla. In July 2020, it was announced that the club would be playing its home games in the Estadio de Teziutlán, the stadium currently holds a capacity of 7,000 and is in the process of an expansion to 12,000. However, the offer was not accepted by the new league. Finally, in the 2020–21 season the team continued to play in the Liga TDP.

Current roster

References

External links 
Twitter

Association football clubs established in 2019
Football clubs in Puebla
2019 establishments in Mexico